Aya Hachem was murdered in Blackburn, Lancashire, England on 17 May 2020.

Aya Hachem was a University of Salford law student from Lebanon who moved to the UK in 2011.

At 15:00 BST on 17 May 2020, Hachem was mistakenly shot dead by hitman Zamir Raja in King Street, Blackburn, a large town in Lancashire, North West England. The killing was a drive-by shooting ordered by Feroz Suleman, manager of a tyre business whose intended target was rival businessman Pachah Khan who was nearby at the time.

After a 12-week trial at Preston Crown Court in 2021, seven men who played a part in the planned shooting were convicted of murder on 3 August and sentenced to life imprisonment on 5 August. They are: Feroz Suleman, Zamir Raja, Anthony Ennis, Ayaz Hussain, Abubakr Satia, Uthman Satia and Kashif Manzoor. Uthman Satia's girlfriend, Judy Chapman, was cleared of murder but convicted of manslaughter. She was sentenced on 1 October to 15 years imprisonment.

References

2020 in England
2020 murders in the United Kingdom
2020s trials
History of Blackburn with Darwen
May 2020 crimes in Europe
May 2020 events in the United Kingdom
Murder in Lancashire
Murder trials
Trials in England